The 4th Visual Effects Society Awards, given in Los Angeles on February 15, 2006, at the Hollywood Palladium, honored the best visual effects in film and television of 2005.  An edited version of the ceremony was broadcast on HDNet.

Winners and nominees
(Winners in bold)

Honorary Awards
George Melies Award for Pioneering:
John Lasseter

Board of Directors Award:
Jim Morris

Film

Television

Other categories

References

External links
 Visual Effects Society

2005
Visual Effects Society Awards
Visual Effects Society Awards
Visual Effects Society Awards
Visual Effects Society Awards